The highways in Victoria are the highest density in any state in Australia. Unlike Australia's other mainland states where vast areas are very sparsely inhabited "outback", population centres spread out over most of the state, with only the far north-west and the Victorian Alps lacking permanent settlement. Highways have therefore been built to service the population centres.

The highways generally radiate from Melbourne and other major cities and rural centres with secondary roads interconnecting the highways to each other.

Most routes have higher traffic than most other states. Highways such as Hume Highway, Western Highway, South Gippsland Highway and Princes Highway have some of the heaviest traffic in Australia.

Many of the highways are built to freeway standard ("M" freeways), while most others are generally sealed and of reasonable quality.

Numbering

Victorian highway naming is straightforward. Most are generally named after the geographical regions and features, cities, towns and settlements along the way. Some are even more straightforward e.g. Western and Northern highways which radiate westwards and northwards from Melbourne. Notable exceptions include some interstate highways and some metropolitan highways.

The numbering system is based on "ring and spoke" system. The 'ring' highways (highways that circle Victoria) numbers are given in the multiple of hundreds e.g. Henty Highway (200), Murray Valley Highway (400) and Great Alpine Road (500) make the outermost ring. Midland Highway (300) and Maroondah Highway (300) is the inner ring.

The spokes generally inherit their original National Route numbers. Otherwise, east-west aligned highways are given even numbers and north-south are given odd numbers. Highways and primary roads are given numbers in multiple of tens. Other roads are given numbers which indicate their general alignment.

Freeways

Primary highways

Secondary highways

Tertiary highways

Urban highways

In addition, several metropolitan roads have been given highway designation, mainly in Melbourne. For details see List of highways in Melbourne

See also

 Highways in Australia for highways in other states and territories
 List of highways in Australia for roads named as highways, but not necessarily classified as highways
 Road transport in Victoria

 
Victoria
Highways
Highways